Justin Dean Kluivert (born 5 May 1999) is a Dutch professional footballer who plays as a winger for La Liga club Valencia, on loan from Serie A club Roma. He also represents the Netherlands national team.

The son of former Dutch international football player Patrick Kluivert, and grandson of former Surinamese football player Kenneth Kluivert, Justin Kluivert began his career at Ajax, coming through the youth system. After playing for two seasons with the Dutch side, in 2018 Kluivert moved to Italian side Roma for €18.75 million. He also represented the Netherlands internationally, first at youth level from 2013, before making his senior debut in 2018.

Club career

Ajax 
Born in Amsterdam, Kluivert came through the AFC Ajax youth program, and had his first professional contract with Ajax. He made his Eerste Divisie debut with Jong Ajax on 16 September 2016 in a game against MVV, replacing Vince Gino Dekker in the 67th minute, in a 1–0 away loss. He also played in the 2016–17 UEFA Youth League, in which he scored in a 2–0 group stage win at PAOK on 2 November.

Kluivert made his first team debut in the Eredivisie on 15 January 2017 in a 1–3 away win against PEC Zwolle, when he replaced Amin Younes in the 39th minute. He scored his first Eredivisie goal on 19 March in an away match against SBV Excelsior, exactly 10 years and one day after his father's last career goal. The match ended in a 1–1 draw. He made six appearances in the 2016–17 UEFA Europa League, and was an unused substitute in the final, a 2–0 loss to Manchester United in Stockholm.

On 26 November 2017, Kluivert opened his account for the season with a hat-trick in a 5–1 home win over Roda JC.

Roma 
On 12 June 2018, Kluivert moved to Italian club Roma, following a telephone call made by Roma legend Francesco Totti to his father, for €18.75 million. He became the fifth Dutch player ever to represent the Italian side. Kluivert chose the number 34 shirt number at Roma as a support for his good friend and former teammate Abdelhak Nouri, who wore it at Ajax; Nouri suffered a career-ending cardiac arrhythmia attack in 2017.

Kluivert became the youngest Roma player to score in the UEFA Champions League after scoring the fourth goal in 5–0 home victory against Viktoria Plzeň on 3 October 2018. It was his first goal for the Giallorossi, and he dedicated it to Nouri. On 16 December, he scored for the first time in the Serie A in a 3–2 home win over Genoa.

For the 2019–20 season, Kluivert changed his shirt number to 99, representing the year he was born.

Loan to RB Leipzig 
On 5 October 2020, Kluivert joined Bundesliga club RB Leipzig on a season-long loan. On 5 December, he scored his first Bundesliga goal in a 3–3 away draw against Bayern Munich. On 8 December, he scored a goal in a 3–2 win over Manchester United in the 2020–21 UEFA Champions League.

Loan to Nice
On 20 July 2021, Kluivert joined French Ligue 1 club Nice on season-long loan with an option to buy.

Loan to Valencia
On 1 September 2022, Kluivert signed for Spanish club Valencia on loan for the 2022–23 season. A few days earlier, he was denied a work permit in England which canceled his transfer to Fulham.

International career
At the 2016 Under 17 Euros held in Azerbaijan, Kluivert played throughout the tournament in which the Netherlands reached the semi finals.

Kluivert earned his first full international call-up in Ronald Koeman’s first Netherlands national football team in March 2018 for the friendlies against England and Portugal. He made his senior debut on 26 March, in a 3–0 win over the reigning European champions Portugal, at the Stade de Genève, replacing Memphis Depay for the final 12 minutes of the match.

Personal life
Justin Kluivert is the son of former Dutch international football player Patrick Kluivert, and grandson of former Surinamese football player Kenneth Kluivert. He is also of Curaçaoan descent through his paternal grandmother. Kluivert has four brothers, including footballer Ruben Kluivert who is currently playing for FC Utrecht.

Career statistics

Club

Honours
Ajax
UEFA Europa League runner-up: 2016–17

Nice
Coupe de France runner-up: 2021–22

Individual
AFC Ajax Talent of the Future (Sjaak Swart Award): 2016–17

References

External links 

 
 
 

1999 births
Living people
Justin
Footballers from Amsterdam
Dutch footballers
Association football wingers
Jong Ajax players
AFC Ajax players
A.S. Roma players
RB Leipzig players
OGC Nice players
Valencia CF players
Eerste Divisie players
Eredivisie players
Serie A players
Bundesliga players
Ligue 1 players
La Liga players
Netherlands youth international footballers
Netherlands under-21 international footballers
Netherlands international footballers
Dutch expatriate footballers
Dutch expatriate sportspeople in Germany
Dutch expatriate sportspeople in Italy
Dutch expatriate sportspeople in France
Dutch expatriate sportspeople in Spain
Expatriate footballers in Germany
Expatriate footballers in Italy
Expatriate footballers in France
Expatriate footballers in Spain
Dutch people of Curaçao descent
Dutch sportspeople of Surinamese descent